Elizabeth Merle Drambour (born August 1, 1965) is an American former soccer player who played as a defender, making seven appearances for the United States women's national team. She is also a semi-professional golfer.

Soccer career
Drambour played for the Shenendehowa Plainsmen in high school, and was selected as an All-American in 1981 and 1982. In college, she played for the George Mason Patriots from 1983 to 1986. She was an NSCAA Second-Team All-American in 1985 and 1986, and was included in the NSCAA All-Region Team in 1986. She was included in the NCAA All-Tournament Team in the championship-winning 1985 edition, where she was the most outstanding defensive player, as well as in 1986. In toal, she recorded 24 assists in 84 appearances for the Patriots. During her career she also competed at the Empire State Games.

Drambour made her international debut for the United States on July 7, 1986, in the 1986 North America Cup against Canada. In total, she made seven appearances for the U.S., earning her final exactly one year later against the same opponent in the North America Cup.

Drambour later began coaching, and was the head coach of the Catholic University Cardinals women's soccer team in 1988. She served as an assistant for the Adirondack Lynx, and also coached the girls' teams of Ballston Spa High School, Saratoga Springs High School, Capital United Premier Soccer, and the Albany Alleycats. She also served as the coach of the Adirondack Region in the 2010 Empire State Games.

She was inducted into the Shenendehowa Athletic Hall of Fame in 2010, as well as the New York State High School Girls Soccer Hall of Fame in 2017.

Golfing career
After her soccer career, Drambour began to play golf. In her first ever USGA event, she managed to reach the final of the U.S. Women's Amateur Public Links in June 1995. However, she ultimately lost to Jo Jo Robertson. She also played golf on the LPGA Futures Tour.

Personal life
Drambour currently resides in Ballston Spa, New York.

Career statistics

International

References

1965 births
Living people
Soccer players from New York (state)
American women's soccer players
American women's soccer coaches
United States women's international soccer players
Women's association football defenders
George Mason Patriots women's soccer players
Golfers from New York (state)
American female golfers